Erica McLain (born January 24, 1986, in Columbus, Ohio) is an American triple jumper.

As a junior athlete, she also competed in the long jump. She finished twelfth at the 2002 World Junior Championships and eighth at the 2003 World Youth Championships. In the triple jump she finished seventh at the 2003 World Youth Championships and eleventh at the 2004 World Junior Championships. She competed at the 2005 World Championships and the 2008 Olympic Games without reaching the final.

Her personal best jump is 14.60w metres, achieved in June 2008 in Des Moines. She has 14.20 metres on the indoor track, achieved in March 2008 in Fayetteville.

Erica was the second winner of the ABC game show "The Hustler" broadcast on January 7, 2021.

References
 

1986 births
Living people
Sportspeople from Columbus, Ohio
American female triple jumpers
Olympic track and field athletes of the United States
Athletes (track and field) at the 2008 Summer Olympics
World Athletics Championships athletes for the United States
Stanford Cardinal women's track and field athletes
USA Outdoor Track and Field Championships winners
USA Indoor Track and Field Championships winners